Leonid Jakovlevich Veyner (17 March 1897 – 26 November 1937) was a Soviet general, born in Horlivka, who was given the rank of Komkor on 21 November 1935. He served in the Imperial Russian Army in World War I and in the Soviet Red Army in the Russian Civil War. He was a recipient of the Order of Lenin, the Order of the Red Banner and the Order of the Red Star (1934). During the Great Purge, he was arrested on 15 August 1937 and later executed in Mariupol. After the death of Joseph Stalin, he was rehabilitated.

Biography
Leonid Veyner was born in Gorlovka in the family of the tailor at the 1897 mine. He had an older brother, Mark. In 1915, during the strike, he was arrested and belonged to the army. In 1917, he finished serving in the old Army as a junior non-commissioned officer. In November 1917, he formed the Guard Cavalry squad. During the Civil War, he was  commander of the Partisan Krasnogvardeisky squad, commander of the Lugano Cavalry Regiment of the Communist Brigade of the 10th Army, Kamyshanskoj Rifle Brigade, 1st Donetsk Special Brigade, Special Cavalry Brigade of the 1st Mounted Army, 132nd Plastunskoj Brigade, and the 60th Rifle Brigade. He participated in the fight against Polish troops in the Ukraine in 1920.

In recognition of his successes in 1919 and 1920, he was twice awarded the Order of the Red Banner (1921, 1923). After the civil war, he graduated from a military academy. In 1934, he was awarded the Order of the Red Star.  He was Military Adviser to Glavkome MDN from 1936 to August 1937. In 1936, he was awarded the "Polar Star" order of Mongol for defeating the Japanese at Lake Buir-Nuur. In early 1937, he was awarded the Order of Lenin.

Repression
Veyner was arrested on 15 August 1937 and sentenced on 26 November 1937. He was rehabilitated, posthumously, on 14 May 1955.

Family
Veyner's older brother, Mark Veyner, also working in the fifth mine, was elected as a member of the Executive Board of the working deputies in the Gorlovsko-Shherbinovskom district in 1917. From October 1917 to March 1918, he was a military commander of the Nikitovka station.

Awards
Order of Lenin (1937)
Order of the Red Banner (twice, in 1921 and 1923)
Order of the Red Star (1934)
Order of the Polar Star (Mongolia, 1936)

Bibliography
 Shevchenko И., Яковенко П. «Горловка в именах и лицах». Издательство "Фонарь" ("Ліхтар"). Горловка – 2007.
 

1897 births
1937 deaths
Veyner
Recipients of the Order of Lenin
Recipients of the Order of the Red Banner
Ukrainian people of World War I
Russian military personnel of World War I
People of the Russian Civil War
Soviet rehabilitations
Great Purge victims from Ukraine